King of the Ants is a 2003 American independent neo-noir crime thriller film directed by Stuart Gordon, written by Charlie Higson, and starring Chris McKenna, Kari Wuhrer, George Wendt, Vernon Wells, and Daniel Baldwin. It was adapted from Higson's 1992 novel of the same name, and was one of the first films produced by The Asylum.

Plot 

Sean Crawley is a struggling young man trying to make ends meet by painting houses in suburban Los Angeles. One day, Sean meets "Duke" Wayne, who introduces Sean to his boss, a shady real estate developer named Ray Matthews. Ray hires Sean as a spy and orders him to follow Eric Gatley, an accountant who has been investigating Ray's company. Problems start when Ray, while drunk, offers Sean $13,000 to kill Eric. Sean accepts his offer and, although ambivalent, ends up killing Gatley by breaking into his house and beating him to death. When Sean goes to collect his pay, however, he is double-crossed and when he insists that they pay him, he is kidnapped and taken to Ray's secluded farm. It emerges that Matthews never had any intention of paying Sean for the killing, for he only wanted to use and eliminate him. But Sean survives from having a bullet put in his head then reveals that he had taken Gatley's work file of evidence and hidden it along with his documentation of events leading to the murder.

When torture fails to make him disclose the whereabouts of the file, Sean is then brutally beaten about the head with golf clubs many times by Ray and his henchmen daily for weeks in an effort to destroy his memory. After suffering a heavy amount of trauma, Sean escapes, killing Duke, and finds his way to a downtown homeless shelter where Gatley's widow, Susan, takes him under her wing, oblivious to his role in her personal tragedy. After she nurses him back to normal, he feels he has been reborn and they become lovers and he moves into her house. But after a few weeks, Susan finds his file describing the murder and, enraged, physically attacks him. Defending himself, Sean accidentally kills her.

Having lost what he saw as his redemption and rebirth, more angry and cynical than ever, Sean returns to Ray's farm and methodically and ruthlessly exacts revenge on his captors; having arrived before Ray, he finds Duke's body and decapitates it, removing the wounds that would implicate his involvement. While waiting for Ray, Sean burns Duke's head in a fire pit along with pictures of Susan, exclaiming that if it wasn't for him and his friends he could have had a happy life. He hides in the house while Ray's henchmen search for him. Sean jumps Carl upstairs and hits him in the chest with a sledgehammer and kicks him down the stairs. Carl lies on the floor unable to move from internal bleeding. Beckett comes into the house to find Carl when Sean breaks his leg and hits his back, paralyzing him.

With the two henchmen unable to move, he moves on to Ray, dousing him in gasoline and setting him on fire. He returns to the house to deal with the wounded Carl and Beckett, who is begging him for medical assistance and asking why. Sean simply replies asking if there needs to be a reason for his revenge. Sean turns the stove on and leaves the house. He changes Ray's shoes to make it appear that the trio were working on the house when an accident occurs. Sean lights one of Ray's shoes on fire and throws it in the house; Beckett and Carl scream and cry as Sean walks away from the house before it explodes.

Cast 
 Chris McKenna as Sean Crawley
 Kari Wuhrer as Susan Gatley
 George Wendt as Duke Wayne
 Vernon Wells as Beckett
 Lionel Mark Smith as Carl
 Timm Sharp as George
Carissa Kosta as Maureen
Ron Livingston as Eric Gatley
 Daniel Baldwin as Ray Matthews
Carlie Westerman as Catlin Gatley
Ian Patrick Williams as Tony
Shuko Akune as Meade Park

Production 
It is based on a novel by writer Charlie Higson, who also wrote the screenplay for the film.  Actor George Wendt read the novel and contacted Higson about a film adaptation.  Higson replied that there had been interest in the past but nothing had materialized.  Wendt then brought the novel to Stuart Gordon's attention, and they were able to get the project off the ground.  Wendt and Gordon had previously worked together in Chicago theater.  It took seven years to find a company willing to produce the film.  The Asylum was the only studio willing to commit to such a dark and violent story.  This was the first film that The Asylum produced; they had previously worked exclusively as a distributor.

Release 
King of the Ants premiered at the 2003 Seattle International Film Festival.

The film was released on DVD by DEJ Productions on June 29, 2004. On July 5, that same year it was released by Mosaic. The film was later released by First Look Pictures on August 24, 2005. First Look would release a SteelBook edition of the film on October 6, 2009.

Reception 
Ken Eisner of Variety wrote that although the film has clever writing, a veteran director, and "starts out engagingly enough", it can't decide whether it is a horror film, neo-noir caper, or psychological thriller.  Marjorie Baumgarten of The Austin Chronicle rated it 3/5 stars and called it "an intriguing indie effort" that is "refreshingly unpredictable". Ain't It Cool News praised the film, calling it director Gordon's best film. The reviewer praised the film's acting, intelligent approach, and difference in comparison to the director's previous works.

Ross Williams of Film Threat rated it 4/5 stars and called it Gordon's best film since Re-Animator.  Mike Pinsky of DVD Verdict wrote that the first half of the film has promise, but "the second half of the script is a complete mess."

References

External links 
 
 
 
 Film's page at The Asylum

2003 films
2003 direct-to-video films
2003 horror films
2003 crime thriller films
2003 independent films
2003 psychological thriller films
American horror thriller films
American psychological horror films
Crime horror films
The Asylum films
2000s English-language films
American films about revenge
Films based on British novels
Films directed by Stuart Gordon
Films set in Los Angeles
2000s American films